Tungsten, or wolfram, is a chemical element with the symbol W and atomic number 74. Tungsten is a rare metal found naturally on Earth almost exclusively as compounds with other elements. It was identified as a new element in 1781 and first isolated as a metal in 1783. Its important ores include scheelite and wolframite, the latter lending the element its alternate name.

Polycrystalline tungsten is an intrinsically brittle and hard material (under standard conditions, when uncombined), making it difficult to work into metal. However, pure single-crystalline tungsten is more ductile and can be cut with a hard-steel hacksaw.

Tungsten occurs in many alloys, which have numerous applications, including incandescent light bulb filaments, X-ray tubes, electrodes in gas tungsten arc welding, superalloys, and radiation shielding. Tungsten's hardness and high density make it suitable for military applications in penetrating projectiles. Tungsten compounds are often used as industrial catalysts.

Tungsten is the only metal in the third transition series that is known to occur in biomolecules, being found in a few species of bacteria and archaea.  However, tungsten interferes with molybdenum and copper metabolism and is somewhat toxic to most forms of animal life.

Characteristics

Physical properties
In its raw form, tungsten is a hard steel-grey metal that is often brittle and hard to work. Purified, monocrystalline tungsten retains its hardness (which exceeds that of many steels), and becomes malleable enough that it can be worked easily. It is worked by forging, drawing, or extruding but it is more commonly formed by sintering.

Of all metals in pure form, tungsten has the highest melting point, lowest vapor pressure (at temperatures above ), and the highest tensile strength. Although carbon remains solid at higher temperatures than tungsten, carbon sublimes at atmospheric pressure instead of melting, so it has no melting point. Moreover, tungsten's most stable crystal phase does not exhibit any high-pressure-induced structural transformations for pressures up to at least 364 gigapascals. Tungsten has the lowest coefficient of thermal expansion of any pure metal. The low thermal expansion and high melting point and tensile strength of tungsten originate from strong metallic bonds formed between tungsten atoms by the 5d electrons.
Alloying small quantities of tungsten with steel greatly increases its toughness.

Tungsten exists in two major crystalline forms: α and β. The former has a body-centered cubic structure and is the more stable form. The structure of the β phase is called A15 cubic; it is metastable, but can coexist with the α phase at ambient conditions owing to non-equilibrium synthesis or stabilization by impurities. Contrary to the α phase which crystallizes in isometric grains, the β form exhibits a columnar habit. The α phase has one third of the electrical resistivity and a much lower superconducting transition temperature TC relative to the β phase: ca. 0.015 K vs. 1–4 K; mixing the two phases allows obtaining intermediate TC values. The TC value can also be raised by alloying tungsten with another metal (e.g. 7.9 K for W-Tc). Such tungsten alloys are sometimes used in low-temperature superconducting circuits.

Isotopes

Naturally occurring tungsten consists of four stable isotopes (182W, 183W, 184W, and 186W) and one very long-lived radioisotope, 180W. Theoretically, all five can decay into isotopes of element 72 (hafnium) by alpha emission, but only 180W has been observed to do so, with a half-life of  years; on average, this yields about two alpha decays of 180W per gram of natural tungsten per year. This rate is equivalent to a specific activity of roughly 63 micro-becquerel per kilogram. This rate of decay is orders of magnitude lower than that observed in carbon or potassium as found on earth, which likewise contain small amounts of long-lived radioactive isotopes. However, due to naturally occurring bismuth being 100% , its specific activity is actually higher than that of natural tungsten at 3 milli-becquerel per kilogram. The other naturally occurring isotopes of tungsten have not been observed to decay, constraining their half-lives to be at least 4 × 1021 years - if they decay at all.

Another 30 artificial radioisotopes of tungsten have been characterized, the most stable of which are 181W with a half-life of 121.2 days, 185W with a half-life of 75.1 days, 188W with a half-life of 69.4 days, 178W with a half-life of 21.6 days, and 187W with a half-life of 23.72 h. All of the remaining radioactive isotopes have half-lives of less than 3 hours, and most of these have half-lives below 8 minutes. Tungsten also has 11 meta states, with the most stable being 179mW (t1/2 6.4 minutes).

Chemical properties
Tungsten is a mostly non-reactive element: it does not react with water, is immune to attack by most acids and bases, and does not react with oxygen or air at room temperature.  At elevated temperatures (i.e., when red-hot) it reacts with oxygen to form the trioxide compound tungsten(VI), WO3.  It will, however, react directly with fluorine (F2) at room temperature to form tungsten(VI) fluoride (WF6), a colorless gas. At around 250 °C it will react with chlorine or bromine, and under certain hot conditions will react with iodine.  Finely divided tungsten is pyrophoric.

The most common formal oxidation state of tungsten is +6, but it exhibits all oxidation states from −2 to +6. Tungsten typically combines with oxygen to form the yellow tungstic oxide, WO3, which dissolves in aqueous alkaline solutions to form tungstate ions, .

Tungsten carbides (W2C and WC) are produced by heating powdered tungsten with carbon. W2C is resistant to chemical attack, although it reacts strongly with chlorine to form tungsten hexachloride (WCl6).

In aqueous solution, tungstate gives the heteropoly acids and polyoxometalate anions under neutral and acidic conditions. As tungstate is progressively treated with acid, it first yields the soluble, metastable "paratungstate A" anion, which over time converts to the less soluble "paratungstate B" anion, . Further acidification produces the very soluble metatungstate anion, after which equilibrium is reached. The metatungstate ion exists as a symmetric cluster of twelve tungsten-oxygen octahedra known as the Keggin anion. Many other polyoxometalate anions exist as metastable species. The inclusion of a different atom such as phosphorus in place of the two central hydrogens in metatungstate produces a wide variety of heteropoly acids, such as phosphotungstic acid H3PW12O40.

Tungsten trioxide can form intercalation compounds with alkali metals. These are known as bronzes; an example is sodium tungsten bronze.

In gaseous form, tungsten forms the diatomic species W2.  These molecules feature a sextuple bond between tungsten atoms — the highest known bond order among stable atoms.

History
In 1781, Carl Wilhelm Scheele discovered that a new acid, tungstic acid, could be made from scheelite (at the time called tungsten). Scheele and Torbern Bergman suggested that it might be possible to obtain a new metal by reducing this acid. In 1783, José and Fausto Elhuyar found an acid made from wolframite that was identical to tungstic acid. Later that year, at the Royal Basque Society in the town of Bergara, Spain, the brothers succeeded in isolating tungsten by reduction of this acid with charcoal, and they are credited with the discovery of the element (they called it "wolfram" or "volfram").

The strategic value of tungsten came to notice in the early 20th century. British authorities acted in 1912 to free the Carrock mine from the German owned Cumbrian Mining Company and, during World War I, restrict German access elsewhere. In World War II, tungsten played a more significant role in background political dealings. Portugal, as the main European source of the element, was put under pressure from both sides, because of its deposits of wolframite ore at Panasqueira. Tungsten's desirable properties such as resistance to high temperatures, its hardness and density, and its strengthening of alloys made it an important raw material for the arms industry, both as a constituent of weapons and equipment and employed in production itself, e.g., in tungsten carbide cutting tools for machining steel.
Now tungsten is used in many more applications such as aircraft & motorsport ballast weights, darts, anti-vibration tooling, and sporting equipment.

Tungsten is unique amongst the elements in that it has been the subject of patent proceedings. In 1928, a US court rejected General Electric's attempt to patent it, overturning  granted in 1913 to William D. Coolidge.

Etymology
The name "tungsten" (which means "heavy stone" in Swedish and was the old Swedish name for the mineral scheelite and other minerals of similar density) is used in English, French, and many other languages as the name of the element, but  "wolfram" (or "volfram") is used in most European (especially Germanic, Spanish and Slavic) languages and is derived from the mineral wolframite, which is the origin of the chemical symbol W. The name "wolframite" is derived from German "wolf rahm" ("wolf soot" or "wolf cream"), the name given to tungsten by Johan Gottschalk Wallerius in 1747. This, in turn, derives from Latin "lupi spuma", the name Georg Agricola used for the element in 1546, which translates into English as "wolf's froth" and is a reference to the large amounts of tin consumed by the mineral during its extraction, as though the mineral devoured it like a wolf. This naming follows a tradition of colorful names miners from the Ore Mountains would give various minerals, out of a superstition that certain ones that looked as if they contained then-known valuable metals but didn't were somehow "hexed". Cobalt (c.f. Kobold), pitchblende (c.f. German "blenden" for "to blind" or "to deceive") and nickel (c.f. "Old Nick") derive their names from the same miner's idiom.

Occurrence

Tungsten has  thus far not been found in nature in its pure form. Instead, tungsten is found mainly in the minerals wolframite and scheelite. Wolframite is iron–manganese tungstate , a solid solution of the two minerals ferberite (FeWO4) and hübnerite (MnWO4), while scheelite is calcium tungstate (CaWO4). Other tungsten minerals range in their level of abundance from moderate to very rare, and have almost no economic value.

Chemical compounds

Tungsten forms chemical compounds in oxidation states from -II to VI. Higher oxidation states, always as oxides, are relevant to its terrestrial occurrence and its biological roles, mid-level oxidation states are often associated with metal clusters, and very low oxidation states are typically associated with CO complexes. The chemistries of tungsten and molybdenum show strong similarities to each other, as well as contrasts with their lighter congener, chromium. The relative rarity of tungsten(III), for example, contrasts with the pervasiveness of the chromium(III) compounds. The highest oxidation state is seen in tungsten(VI) oxide (WO3). Tungsten(VI) oxide is soluble in aqueous base, forming tungstate (WO42−). This oxyanion condenses at lower pH values, forming polyoxotungstates.

The broad range of oxidation states of tungsten is reflected in its various chlorides:
 Tungsten(II) chloride, which exists as the hexamer W6Cl12
 Tungsten(III) chloride, which exists as the hexamer W6Cl18
 Tungsten(IV) chloride, WCl4, a black solid, which adopts a polymeric structure.
 Tungsten(V) chloride WCl5, a black solid which adopts a dimeric structure.
 Tungsten(VI) chloride WCl6, which contrasts with the instability of MoCl6.

Organotungsten compounds are numerous and also span a range of oxidation states. Notable examples include the trigonal prismatic  and octahedral .

Production

Reserves 
The world's reserves of tungsten are 3,200,000 tonnes; they are mostly located in China (1,800,000 t), Canada (290,000 t), Russia (160,000 t), Vietnam (95,000 t) and Bolivia. As of 2017, China, Vietnam and Russia are the leading suppliers with 79,000, 7,200 and 3,100 tonnes, respectively. Canada had ceased production in late 2015 due to the closure of its sole tungsten mine. Meanwhile, Vietnam had significantly increased its output in the 2010s, owing to the major optimization of its domestic refining operations, and overtook Russia and Bolivia.

China remains the world's leader not only in production, but also in export and consumption of tungsten products. Tungsten production is gradually increasing outside China because of the rising demand. Meanwhile, its supply by China is strictly regulated by the Chinese Government, which fights illegal mining and excessive pollution originating from mining and refining processes.

There is a large deposit of tungsten ore on the edge of Dartmoor in the United Kingdom, which was exploited during World War I and World War II as the Hemerdon Mine. Following increases in tungsten prices, this mine was reactivated in 2014, but ceased activities in 2018.

Within the EU, the Austrian Felbertal scheelite deposit is one of the few producing tungsten mines. Portugal is one of Europe's main tungsten producers, with 121 kt of contained tungsten in mineral concentrates from 1910 to 2020, accounting for roughly 3.3% of the global production.

Tungsten is considered to be a conflict mineral due to the unethical mining practices observed in the Democratic Republic of the Congo.

Extraction 
Tungsten is extracted from its ores in several stages. The ore is eventually converted to tungsten(VI) oxide (WO3), which is heated with hydrogen or carbon to produce powdered tungsten. Because of tungsten's high melting point, it is not commercially feasible to cast tungsten ingots. Instead, powdered tungsten is mixed with small amounts of powdered nickel or other metals, and sintered. During the sintering process, the nickel diffuses into the tungsten, producing an alloy.

Tungsten can also be extracted by hydrogen reduction of WF6:

WF6 + 3 H2 → W + 6 HF

or pyrolytic decomposition:

WF6 → W + 3 F2 (ΔHr = +)

Tungsten is not traded as a futures contract and cannot be tracked on exchanges like the London Metal Exchange. The tungsten industry often uses independent pricing references such as Argus Media or Metal Bulletin as a basis for contracts. The prices are usually quoted for tungsten concentrate or WO3.

Applications

Approximately half of the tungsten is consumed for the production of hard materials – namely tungsten carbide – with the remaining major use being in alloys and steels. Less than 10% is used in other chemical compounds. Because of the high ductile-brittle transition temperature of tungsten, its products are conventionally manufactured through powder metallurgy, spark plasma sintering, chemical vapor deposition, hot isostatic pressing, and thermoplastic routes. A more flexible manufacturing alternative is selective laser melting, which is a form of 3D printing and allows creating complex three-dimensional shapes.

Industrial 
Tungsten is mainly used in the production of hard materials based on tungsten carbide (WC), one of the hardest carbides.  WC is an efficient electrical conductor, but W2C is less so.  WC is used to make wear-resistant abrasives, and "carbide" cutting tools such as knives, drills, circular saws, dies, milling and turning tools used by the metalworking, woodworking, mining, petroleum and construction industries. Carbide tooling is actually a ceramic/metal composite, where metallic cobalt acts as a binding (matrix) material to hold the WC particles in place.  This type of industrial use accounts for about 60% of current tungsten consumption.

The jewelry industry makes rings of sintered tungsten carbide, tungsten carbide/metal composites, and also metallic tungsten. WC/metal composite rings use nickel as the metal matrix in place of cobalt because it takes a higher luster when polished. Sometimes manufacturers or retailers refer to tungsten carbide as a metal, but it is a ceramic. Because of tungsten carbide's hardness, rings made of this material are extremely abrasion resistant, and will hold a burnished finish longer than rings made of metallic tungsten. Tungsten carbide rings are brittle, however, and may crack under a sharp blow.

Alloys

The hardness and heat resistance of tungsten can contribute to useful alloys. A good example is high-speed steel, which can contain as much as 18% tungsten. Tungsten's high melting point makes tungsten a good material for applications like rocket nozzles, for example in the UGM-27 Polaris submarine-launched ballistic missile. Tungsten alloys are used in a wide range of applications, including the aerospace and automotive industries and radiation shielding. Superalloys containing tungsten, such as Hastelloy and Stellite, are used in turbine blades and wear-resistant parts and coatings.

Tungsten's heat resistance makes it useful in arc welding applications when combined with another highly-conductive metal such as silver or copper. The silver or copper provides the necessary conductivity and the tungsten allows the welding rod to withstand the high temperatures of the arc welding environment.

Permanent magnets
Quenched (martensitic) tungsten steel (approx. 5.5% to 7.0% W with 0.5% to 0.7% C) was used for making hard permanent magnets, due to its high remanence and coercivity, as noted by John Hopkinson (1849–1898) as early as 1886. The magnetic properties of a metal or an alloy are very sensitive to microstructure. For example, while the element tungsten is not ferromagnetic (but iron is), when it is present in steel in these proportions, it stabilizes the martensite phase, which has greater ferromagnetism than the ferrite (iron) phase due to its greater resistance to magnetic domain wall motion.

Military
Tungsten, usually alloyed with nickel, iron, or cobalt to form heavy alloys, is used in kinetic energy penetrators as an alternative to depleted uranium, in applications where uranium's radioactivity is problematic even in depleted form, or where uranium's additional pyrophoric properties are not desired (for example, in ordinary small arms bullets designed to penetrate body armor). Similarly, tungsten alloys have also been used in shells, grenades, and missiles, to create supersonic shrapnel. Germany used tungsten during World War II to produce shells for anti-tank gun designs using the Gerlich squeeze bore principle to achieve very high muzzle velocity and enhanced armor penetration from comparatively small caliber and light weight field artillery. The weapons were highly effective but a shortage of tungsten used in the shell core, caused in part by the Wolfram Crisis, limited their use.

Tungsten has also been used in Dense inert metal explosives, which use it as dense powder to reduce collateral damage while increasing the lethality of explosives within a small radius.

Chemical applications
Tungsten(IV) sulfide is a high temperature lubricant and is a component of catalysts for hydrodesulfurization. MoS2 is more commonly used for such applications.

Tungsten oxides are used in ceramic glazes and calcium/magnesium tungstates are used widely in fluorescent lighting. Crystal tungstates are used as scintillation detectors in nuclear physics and nuclear medicine. Other salts that contain tungsten are used in the chemical and tanning industries.
Tungsten oxide (WO3) is incorporated into selective catalytic reduction (SCR) catalysts found in coal-fired power plants. These catalysts convert nitrogen oxides (NOx) to nitrogen (N2) and water (H2O) using ammonia (NH3). The tungsten oxide helps with the physical strength of the catalyst and extends catalyst life. Tungsten containing catalysts are promising for epoxidation, oxidation, and hydrogenolysis reactions. Tungsten heteropoly acids are key component of multifunctional catalysts.  Tungstates can be used as photocatalyst, while the tungsten sulfide as electrocatalyst.

Niche uses
Applications requiring its high density include weights, counterweights, ballast keels for yachts, tail ballast for commercial aircraft, rotor weights for civil and military helicopters, and as ballast in race cars for NASCAR and Formula One. Being slightly less than twice the density, Tungsten is seen as an alternative (albeit more expensive) to lead fishing sinkers. Depleted uranium is also used for these purposes, due to similarly high density. Seventy-five-kg blocks of tungsten were used as "cruise balance mass devices" on the entry vehicle portion of the 2012 Mars Science Laboratory spacecraft. It is an ideal material to use as a dolly for riveting, where the mass necessary for good results can be achieved in a compact bar. High-density alloys of tungsten with nickel, copper or iron are used in high-quality darts (to allow for a smaller diameter and thus tighter groupings) or for artificial flys (tungsten beads allow the fly to sink rapidly). Tungsten is also used as a heavy bolt to lower the rate of fire of the SWD M11/9 sub-machine gun from 1300 RPM to 700 RPM. Tungsten has seen use recently in nozzles for 3D printing; the high wear resistance and thermal conductivity of tungsten carbide improves the printing of abrasive filaments. Some string instrument strings are wound with tungsten. Tungsten is used as an absorber on the electron telescope on the Cosmic Ray System of the two Voyager spacecraft.

Gold substitution
Its density, similar to that of gold, allows tungsten to be used in jewelry as an alternative to gold or platinum. Metallic tungsten is hypoallergenic, and is harder than gold alloys (though not as hard as tungsten carbide), making it useful for rings that will resist scratching, especially in designs with a brushed finish.

Because the density is so similar to that of gold (tungsten is only 0.36% less dense), and its price of the order of one-thousandth, tungsten can also be used in counterfeiting of gold bars, such as by plating a tungsten bar with gold, which has been observed since the 1980s, or taking an existing gold bar, drilling holes, and replacing the removed gold with tungsten rods. The densities are not exactly the same, and other properties of gold and tungsten differ, but gold-plated tungsten will pass superficial tests.

Gold-plated tungsten is available commercially from China (the main source of tungsten), both in jewelry and as bars.

Electronics
Because it retains its strength at high temperatures and has a high melting point, elemental tungsten is used in many high-temperature applications, such as incandescent light bulb, cathode-ray tube, and vacuum tube filaments, heating elements, and rocket engine nozzles. Its high melting point also makes tungsten suitable for aerospace and high-temperature uses such as electrical, heating, and welding applications, notably in the gas tungsten arc welding process (also called tungsten inert gas (TIG) welding).

Because of its conductive properties and relative chemical inertness, tungsten is also used in electrodes, and in the emitter tips in electron-beam instruments that use field emission guns, such as electron microscopes. In electronics, tungsten is used as an interconnect material in integrated circuits, between the silicon dioxide dielectric material and the transistors. It is used in metallic films, which replace the wiring used in conventional electronics with a coat of tungsten (or molybdenum) on silicon.

The electronic structure of tungsten makes it one of the main sources for X-ray targets, and also for shielding from high-energy radiations (such as in the radiopharmaceutical industry for shielding radioactive samples of FDG). It is also used in gamma imaging as a material from which coded apertures are made, due to its excellent shielding properties. Tungsten powder is used as a filler material in plastic composites, which are used as a nontoxic substitute for lead in bullets, shot, and radiation shields. Since this element's thermal expansion is similar to borosilicate glass, it is used for making glass-to-metal seals. In addition to its high melting point, when tungsten is doped with potassium, it leads to an increased shape stability (compared with non-doped tungsten). This ensures that the filament does not sag, and no undesired changes occur.

Nanowires
Through top-down nanofabrication processes, tungsten nanowires have been fabricated and studied since 2002. Due to a particularly high surface to volume ratio, the formation of a surface oxide layer and the single crystal nature of such material, the mechanical properties differ fundamentally from those of bulk tungsten. Such tungsten nanowires have potential applications in nanoelectronics and importantly as pH probes and gas sensors. In similarity to silicon nanowires, tungsten nanowires are frequently produced from a bulk tungsten precursor followed by a thermal oxidation step to control morphology in terms of length and aspect ratio. Using the Deal–Grove model it is possible to predict the oxidation kinetics of nanowires fabricated through such thermal oxidation processing.

Fusion power 
Due to its high melting point and good erosion resistance, tungsten is a lead candidate for the most exposed sections of the plasma-facing inner wall of nuclear fusion reactors. It will be used as the plasma-facing material of the divertor in the ITER reactor, and is currently in use in the JET test reactor.

Biological role
Tungsten, at atomic number Z = 74, is the heaviest element known to be biologically functional. It is used by some bacteria and archaea, but not in eukaryotes. For example, enzymes called oxidoreductases use tungsten similarly to molybdenum by using it in a tungsten-pterin complex with molybdopterin (molybdopterin, despite its name, does not contain molybdenum, but may complex with either molybdenum or tungsten in use by living organisms). Tungsten-using enzymes typically reduce carboxylic acids to aldehydes. The tungsten oxidoreductases may also catalyse oxidations. The first tungsten-requiring enzyme to be discovered also requires selenium, and in this case the tungsten-selenium pair may function analogously to the molybdenum-sulfur pairing of some molybdopterin-requiring enzymes. One of the enzymes in the oxidoreductase family which sometimes employ tungsten (bacterial formate dehydrogenase H) is known to use a selenium-molybdenum version of molybdopterin. Acetylene hydratase is an unusual metalloenzyme in that it catalyzes a hydration reaction. Two reaction mechanisms have been proposed, in one of which there is a direct interaction between the tungsten atom and the C≡C triple bond. Although a tungsten-containing xanthine dehydrogenase from bacteria has been found to contain tungsten-molydopterin and also non-protein bound selenium, a tungsten-selenium molybdopterin complex has not been definitively described.

In soil, tungsten metal oxidizes to the tungstate anion. It can be selectively or non-selectively imported by some prokaryotic organisms and may substitute for molybdate in certain enzymes. Its effect on the action of these enzymes is in some cases inhibitory and in others positive. The soil's chemistry determines how the tungsten polymerizes; alkaline soils cause monomeric tungstates; acidic soils cause polymeric tungstates.

Sodium tungstate and lead have been studied for their effect on earthworms. Lead was found to be lethal at low levels and sodium tungstate was much less toxic, but the tungstate completely inhibited their reproductive ability.

Tungsten has been studied as a biological copper metabolic antagonist, in a role similar to the action of molybdenum. It has been found that  salts may be used as biological copper chelation chemicals, similar to the tetrathiomolybdates.

In archaea
Tungsten is essential for some archaea. The following tungsten-utilizing enzymes are known:
 Aldehyde ferredoxin oxidoreductase (AOR) in Thermococcus strain ES-1
 Formaldehyde ferredoxin oxidoreductase (FOR) in Thermococcus litoralis
 Glyceraldehyde-3-phosphate ferredoxin oxidoreductase (GAPOR) in Pyrococcus furiosus
A wtp system is known to selectively transport tungsten in archaea:
 WtpA is tungsten-binding protein of ABC family of transporters
 WptB is a permease
 WtpC is ATPase

Health factors 

Because tungsten is a rare metal and its compounds are generally inert, the effects of tungsten on the environment are limited. The abundance of tungsten in the Earth's crust is thought to be about 1.5 parts per million. It is one of the rarer elements.

It was at first believed to be relatively inert and an only slightly toxic metal, but beginning in the year 2000, the risk presented by tungsten alloys, its dusts and particulates to induce cancer and several other adverse effects in animals as well as humans has been highlighted from in vitro and in vivo experiments.
The median lethal dose LD50 depends strongly on the animal and the method of administration and varies between 59 mg/kg (intravenous, rabbits) and 5000 mg/kg (tungsten metal powder, intraperitoneal, rats).

People can be exposed to tungsten in the workplace by breathing it in, swallowing it, skin contact, and eye contact. The National Institute for Occupational Safety and Health (NIOSH) has set a recommended exposure limit (REL) of 5 mg/m3 over an 8-hour workday and a short term limit of 10 mg/m3.

See also
 Field emission gun
 Tungsten oxide
 List of chemical elements name etymologies
 List of chemical elements naming controversies

References

External links

 Properties, Photos, History, MSDS
 CDC – NIOSH Pocket Guide to Chemical Hazards
 Tungsten at The Periodic Table of Videos (University of Nottingham)
 Picture in the collection from Heinrich Pniok 
 Elementymology & Elements Multidict by Peter van der Krogt – Tungsten
 International Tungsten Industry Association

 
Chemical elements
Transition metals
Refractory metals
Chemical elements with body-centered cubic structure
Native element minerals